The Arup S-4 (Model 104) is the last in a series of round-wing aircraft from C.L. Snyder.

Design and development
The S-4 was engineered by Raoul Hoffman. The test pilot was Glenn Doolittle, a cousin of Jimmy Doolittle.

The S-4 used a low aspect ratio, semi-circular planform wing with a conventional landing gear and a small rudder with attached elevator on the rear of the fuselage. The aircraft was entered through a door mounted on the bottom of the aircraft.

Operational history
The S-4 prototype flew extensively in promotional demonstrations. The S-4 was emblazoned with Sears Roebuck and Company logos. The aircraft was scrapped for war materials in World War II.

Variants
 Hoffman Flying Wing a design based on the Arup S-4 aircraft.
 Milt Hatfield Little Bird - similar design.

Aircraft on display
A replica is on display in the atrium of South Bend Airport

Specifications (S-4)

References

1930s United States experimental aircraft
Single-engined tractor aircraft
Aircraft first flown in 1935
Mid-wing aircraft